Sammy Apollo Kapiʻikauinamokuonalani Amalu (1917-1986) was a Kanaka Maoli descendant of a Hawaiian high chiefess, socialite, ex-con, and columnist with The Honolulu Advertiser. Known by the media as "Hawaiʻi's favorite rascal," Amalu went by many aliases throughout his life. He famously posed as a mysterious Indian Maharaja in San Francisco, a banker named Albert Wilcox, and a Swiss-based syndicate who went by The Presidium, to name a few.

Sheraton Deal 
Playing the part of a Swiss-based syndicate, Amalu is popularly known for his role in a multi-million-dollar real-estate hoax called the "Sheraton Deal," where he was able to fool wealthy business tycoons who held large swaths of Hawaiian land into believing that the deal was legitimate. In May 1962, prominent headlines in Honolulu's newspapers printed columns about a mysterious syndicate from Switzerland who offered the Sheraton Hotels $34 million for the land they had purchased just three years before for $18 million. The hotel franchise was looking at a $16 million profit.

During this time, Amalu offered Molokaʻi Ranch executive George Murphy $5 million for the ranch's land. The very next day, Amalu posed an offer to purchase the entirety of Mākaha Valley for $9 million, as well as $1.2 million for the Waianae Development Company owned by a businessman named Chinn Ho.

While Amalu was playing the role of a syndicate, he was able to garner representation through the real-estate firm of Milton Beamer and Ann Feltzer, which aided in his successful endeavor to fool big money. Within a single week, Amalu made seven offers on real-estate, which totaled $62 million. Another factor in Amalu's successful prank was his claim that he had married an Italian Princess named Maria. Amalu claimed that Maria and their son were both financiers in his business transactions. Amalu later admitted that the entire scheme was a joke.

Marriages 
Little is known about Amalu's claims to being married other than what he shared with reporters and columnists. Only one of Amalu's marriages is confirmed to that of a Mrs. Jane Tomberlin. Mrs. Tomberlin had been married to a millionaire from Texas before she married Amalu in 1956 at the Brown Palace Hotel in Denver, Colorado. On their wedding day in November 1956, Amalu failed to show up to the altar, claiming that he had been abducted by his brother in Texas, who disagreed with the marriage. Regardless, Mrs. Tomberlin continued with the reception, serving champagne to her guests, some of whom had come from as far away as California. Amalu reconnected with Mrs. Tomberlin not long after, and the two were married at the Antlers Hotel in Colorado Springs. Five days after their wedding, FBI agents arrested Amalu in Texas because his checks in both Denver and Texas bounced. Mrs. Tomberlain then filed an annulment and cut financial ties with Amalu as the $45,000 check he used to purchase their home in San Francisco also bounced. Mrs. Tomberlin later reversed her decision to annul their marriage.

In January 1946, The Honolulu Advertiser printed a story in the society section that spoke of Sammy Amalu's marriage to an Italian princess named Maria Anastasia di Torlonia. According to the article, Princess Maria was the daughter of Mrs. Drexel Palmer-Hyde from Philadelphia and Prince Vittorio Alesandro di Torlonia. The article went into great detail about the royal couple's lavish ceremony, attire, and jewels. However, readers eventually started to doubt the validity of the story because the source of the writing was obscure. Some readers wondered if the article was submitted by letter because it had not been credited to any press outside Honolulu. Fantastical stories of the so-called royal couple circulated through The Honolulu Advertiser's Society section leading some presses like the Honolulu Newsweek to proclaim the story a sham. Bob Krauss, (a columnist who continued Amalu's controversial newspaper column in the latter years of Amalu's life called “The Special World of Sammy Amalu"), asked the then elderly Amalu about this wedding to the Princess. According to Krauss, Amalu seemed surprised by the article written in 1946 and claimed to have been married three years before to a Mrs. Irmgard Spaur von Bohlen in Jamaica. According to Amalu, the two were divorced a year later, in 1942. After this divorce, Amalu then claimed to marry Maria, referred to as "Mimi."

Some in the Hawaiian community have speculated that Amalu was māhū (a third-gendered/ person in the middle of the gender spectrum). This speculation does have some credibility because Amalu was medically discharged from his position as a U.S. Army private on the grounds of homosexuality. When questioned about it, Amalu always denied this allegation.

Career 
Amalu was also known to push the lines of social norms in his writing. While incarcerated at Folsom Prison in 1967, serving time on embezzlement charges, Amalu gained a position as a columnist for the Honolulu Advertiser. He made his way into this position by writing letters to his former Punahou School classmate and the editor of the advertiser, Mr. Thurston Twigg-Smith. Twigg-Smith was the grandson of the infamous Hawaiian annexationist Lorrin A. Thurston who founded the Honolulu Advertiser. Then, in 1968, the column called “The World of Sammy Amalu” was created. Amalu produced a diverse cache of political and social commentary about gun and prison reform, sexuality, prison life, political issues in Hawaiʻi, as well as Kānaka Maoli traditions, genealogy, and history. In 1968, Folsom Prison's warden stopped Amaluʻs columns because prison officials had grown uncomfortable with Amaluʻs work. Public outcry from his readership resounded in pleas to reinstate Amaluʻs right to write. Some of Amalu's fans made their pleas to the then Governor of California, Ronald Reagan, in hopes of garnering his support to overturn the decision. Amalu's case was taken up by the civil rights lawyer George T. Davis, and Amalu's columns soon began again.

In 1970 Amalu was released from prison on parole. Upon returning to Honolulu, Amalu was given a full-time columnist position with the Honolulu Advertiser.

Latter years and death 
In 1976 Amalu became paralyzed below the waist after enduring an embolism. However, this did not stop him from making public appearances. In 1984, Amalu testified in defense of Mrs. Gertrude K, Toledo, in her husband's murder trial. Mrs. Toledo was later relieved of any suspicion in her husband's death. Two years later, in 1986, Sammy Amalu passed away. Sixteen years before his passing, Amalu published his own obituary, which read:

“Sing no sad songs over my mortal dust. Nor come to me weeping. I was born of an ancient line of a high and princely house. I have known a true friend. I have loved a good woman. I have fathered a son. I have known tears. I have tasted victory; I have sipped of failure. Is that not enough? Say only this of me when I am no more: He was a child of a princess, and the dust of this flesh was fashioned of Hawaiʻis soil!”

Bibliography 

1986 deaths
1917 births
Fraudsters
Honolulu
Columnists
Folsom, California
Native Hawaiian writers